Harikrishnan Nadar Vasanthakumar (14 April 195028 August 2020) was an Indian businessman and politician from Tamil Nadu. He was the founder and chairman of Vasanth & Co, one of the largest retail home appliance chains in Tamil Nadu. He was also the founder and managing director of the Tamil satellite TV channel Vasanth TV. He was elected as the member of parliament to the 17th Lok Sabha from Kanyakumari constituency in the 2019 Indian general election. He was also elected as member of the Tamil Nadu Legislative Assembly from Nanguneri constituency in the 2006 and 2016 elections.

Early life 
Vasanthakumar was born in Agastheeswaram in the Kanniyakumari district of Tamil Nadu to Harikrishnan Nadar and Thangammal on 14 April 1950. He completed his primary education from a Panchayat board school in Kanniyakumari, later obtaining his bachelor's degree in Tamil literature from the Madurai University, as well as a master's degree. His brother, Kumari Ananthan, was also a legislator from the Indian National Congress.

Business career 
He started his career as a salesman in the early 1970s, including working with VGP. In 1978, he started his own home appliances sales showroom Vasanth & Co, with its first store in the T. Nagar neighborhood in Chennai. The company went on to become one of the leading retail chains with showrooms across Tamil Nadu, Karnataka, Kerala, and Puducherry. Vasanthakumar and his company are credited with pioneering sales of consumer electronics goods on equated monthly installments in the Indian market, as well as centralized after-sales support.

Vasanthakumar also found the Tamil satellite television network Vasanth TV in 2008.

Political career 
Vasanthakumar started his political career as a worker with the Indian National Congress political party taking up multiple local organizational roles. His first electoral politics stint was in 2006, as the MLA of Tamil Nadu from the Nanguneri constituency in Tamil Nadu. He won the elections by defeating S.P. Sooryakumar of the All India Anna Dravida Munnetra Kazhagam political party. This was a significant win for the party because it was after three decades that the party was able to win this electoral seat. One of his campaign promises included the establishment of a Special economic zone with a hi-tech park in Nanguneri. He contested the election from Kanyakumari Lok Sabha constituency in 2014 against Pon Radhakrishnan and lost the elections. In his second term as a member of the Tamil Nadu Legislative Assembly, he represented Nanguneri again in 2016. He served the constituency until 2019 when he went on to become the MP, as a member of the 17th Lok Sabha from the Kanyakumari Lok Sabha constituency. He won this election, against the incumbent Minister of State in the Ministry of Finance, and Minister of State in the Ministry of Shipping Pon Radhakrishnan, by winning with a margin of over 250,000 votes.

He was the working President of the Tamil Nadu Congress Committee (TNCC) from 2019 through his death in August 2020. Earlier, he had served as the Vice-President of the TNCC, and also as the Chairman of the TNCC Traders wing.

Writings 
Vasanthakumar wrote a three part autobiographical book series in Tamil, titled "Vetri Padikattu" – "வெற்றிப் படிக்கட்டு" – (English: Ladder of Success), focusing on his entrepreneurial success and community building initiatives.

Death
Vasanthakumar died of complications from COVID-19 at the Apollo Hospitals in Chennai on 28 August 2020, during the COVID-19 pandemic in India. He was admitted to the hospital on 10 August 2020, and was on ECMO and ventilator life support, prior to his death.

President Ram Nath Kovind, Prime Minister Narendra Modi, Tamil Nadu Chief Minister Edappadi K. Palaniswami, Congress leader and Wayanad MP Rahul Gandhi, Governor of Tamil Nadu Banwarilal Purohit among others were amongst those who expressed their condolences.

He is survived by his wife Tamil Selvi, two sons, and a daughter. His wife was also undergoing treatment for COVID-19 at the time of his death.

References 

|-

External links 
Vasanth TV

1950 births
2020 deaths
India MPs 2019–present
20th-century Indian businesspeople
21st-century Indian businesspeople
Businesspeople from Tamil Nadu
Deaths from the COVID-19 pandemic in India
Indian National Congress politicians from Tamil Nadu
People from Kanyakumari district
Tamil Nadu politicians
Tamil businesspeople
United Progressive Alliance candidates in the 2014 Indian general election